Christopher Hubbard (born April 23, 1991) is an American football guard and offensive tackle for the Cleveland Browns of the National Football League (NFL). He played college football at UAB.

Early years
Hubbard played high school football at George Washington Carver High School in Columbus, Georgia. He started at left tackle his junior and senior years as the team went 26–3 and won the 2007 Georgia High School Association Class AAA state championship. He was named to the Columbus Ledger-Enquirer All-City team, the Associated Press Class AAA first-team All-State team and recorded 77 pancake blocks his senior year.

College career
Hubbard played for the UAB Blazers of the University of Alabama at Birmingham from 2009 to 2012. He was named to the Conference USA All-Freshman team in 2009. He was an All-Conference USA selection his senior year in 2012.

Professional career

Pittsburgh Steelers
On April 27, 2013, the Pittsburgh Steelers signed Hubbard as an undrafted free agent after going undrafted in the 2013 NFL Draft. He was released by the Steelers on August 31, 2013. He was signed to the Steelers' practice squad on September 3, 2013. Hubbard was signed to a future contract on December 31, 2013. He made his NFL debut on September 21, 2014, against the Carolina Panthers. Hubbard was cut by the Pittsburgh Steelers on August 19, 2016.

On October 9, 2016, he received his first career start against the New York Jets after right tackle Marcus Gilbert was unable to play due to injury. He played 76 offensive snaps as the Steelers won 31–13. He received a lot of praise for his performance from coaches Mike Tomlin, Todd Haley, and quarterback Ben Roethlisberger. He received his second start on October 23, against the New England Patriots.

Hubbard began the  season as the backup right tackle behind Marcus Gilbert. On September 24, 2017, Hubbard received his first start of the season in place of right tackle Marcus Gilbert, who was out with an injured hamstring. He went on to start the five of the next six games at right tackle.

Cleveland Browns
On March 15, 2018, the Cleveland Browns signed Hubbard to a five-year, $37.50 million contract that includes $15.15 million guaranteed and a signing bonus of $4 million. He was named the Browns starting right tackle, and started all 16 games.

Hubbard retained his starting role as the starting right tackle in 2019, but was demoted to a backup offensive tackle and guard after the Cleveland Browns signed free agent Jack Conklin to replace Hubbard at right tackle and also drafted Jedrick Wills in the first round (10th overall) of the 2020 NFL Draft. Hubbard agreed to restructure his contract in order to remain with the team. Hubbard was placed on the reserve/COVID-19 list by the team on November 13, 2020, and activated on November 26. Hubbard was placed on injured reserve on December 22, 2020, as a result of a knee injury he sustained during the Browns' Week 15 matchup.

On October 12, 2021, Hubbard was placed on injured reserve.

On March 16, 2022, Hubbard re-signed with the Browns on a one-year contract.

Personal life
In 2012, Chris married Tamara Hubbard. The couple had their first child, a son named Creed Eason, in September 2016.

References

External links
UAB bio
Cleveland Browns bio

Living people
1991 births
Players of American football from Columbus, Georgia
American football offensive guards
African-American players of American football
UAB Blazers football players
Pittsburgh Steelers players
Cleveland Browns players
George Washington Carver High School (Columbus, Georgia) alumni
21st-century African-American sportspeople